Kechid (also Romanized as Kechīd; also known as Kajīd, and Kechīd) is a village in Keseliyan Rural District, in the Central District of Savadkuh County, Mazandaran Province, Iran. At the 2006 census, its population was 114, in 32 families.

References 

Populated places in Savadkuh County